Nonna is the Italian word for grandmother and a Russian feminine name. It may refer to:

People
 Saint Non, mother of David, the patron saint of Wales
 Nonna of Nazianzus (died 370s), Catholic and Orthodox saint
 Nonna Bella (fl. 1970s), Turkish singer
 Nonna Debonne (born 1985), French footballer
 Nonna Grishayeva (born 1971), Russian actress
 Nonna Karakashyan (born 1940), Armenian chess player
 Nonna Mordyukova (1925–2008), Soviet actress
 John Nonna (born 1948), American fencer
 Ion Nonna Otescu (1888–1940), Romanian composer

Arts, entertainment, and media
 Nonna, a Russian-style character from the Japanese anime series Girls und Panzer
 Nonna Felicità, a 1938 Italian film

Other uses
 4022 Nonna, an asteroid
 Church of St Nonna, Bradstone, Devon, England
 St Nonna's Church, Altarnun, Cornwall, England

See also
 Nana (disambiguation)
 Nona (disambiguation)

Feminine given names
Russian feminine given names